Stefan Balšić (fl. 1419-40), known as Stefan Maramonte, was a Zetan nobleman. He was the son of Konstantin Balšić and Helena Thopia. After Konstantin's death (1402), Helena entered the Republic of Venice and then lived with her sister Maria. Since Maria was married to Phillip Maramonte, the Venetians and Ragusans often referred to Stefan Balšić with the name Maramonte. He was initially a close associate to Zetan lord Balša III (r. 1403-1421), being his vassal. Balša III and Stefan fought against the Republic of Venice, and Stefan helped in the administration of the land as co-ruler with Balša III, he did however not succeed Balša III. Balša III, who died on 28 April 1421, had decided to pass the rule of Zeta to his uncle, the Serbian Despot Stefan Lazarević. When the Second Scutari War between Venice and Despot Stefan began, he [...]. Stefan left Apulia in the summer of 1426, seeking to take Zeta. During the 1427–28 conflict, Maramonte went to the Ottoman court where he sought the support of Sultan Murad II for his appointment as the Lord of Zeta. There, he met Skanderbeg, who was a hostage at the Ottoman court. Maramonte married Vlajka Kastrioti, the sister of Skanderbeg. Supported by the Ottomans, Maramonte, accompanied by Gojčin Crnojević and Little Tanush,  plundered the region around Scutari and Ulcinj, and attacked Drivast in 1429, but failed to capture it. Since his attempts failed, Maramonte surrendered to the Venetians and served as their military officer in the campaigns in Flanders and Lombardia.

See also

Annotations
His name was Stefan Balšić, but he was called Stefan Maramonte (sr. Stefan Crnogorac, de. Stephan Czernogoraz), meaning "Stefan from the Black Mountain (Montenegro)".

References

14th-century births
15th-century deaths
People of the Serbian Despotate
Balšić noble family
Stefan
Lords of Zeta
15th-century Venetian people